Geoffrey Pares is a former Australian tennis player who competed 1959–1967.

References

Australian male tennis players
Year of birth missing (living people)
Living people
Place of birth missing (living people)
20th-century Australian people